"Don't Give Up" is a song written and recorded by American singer Timothy B. Schmit, released as the second single from his second solo studio album, Timothy B (1987).

Charts

References

External links
 

Timothy B. Schmit songs
MCA Records singles
1988 singles
1987 songs